Vitaliy Kilchytskyy (born 17 June 1988) is a Ukrainian biathlete.

References

External links
 Biathlon.com.ua
 IBU Datacenter

1988 births
Living people
People from Novoyavorivsk
Ukrainian male biathletes
Universiade medalists in biathlon
Universiade gold medalists for Ukraine
Universiade silver medalists for Ukraine
Competitors at the 2013 Winter Universiade
Competitors at the 2015 Winter Universiade
Sportspeople from Lviv Oblast
21st-century Ukrainian people